Grains Research and Development Corporation is an Australian research statutory corporation founded in October 1990 under the Primary Industries and Energy Research and Development Act, 1989 (PIERD Act). It invests in projects and partnerships to drive profitability and productivity in Australia's grains industry. It is funded by the Australian government and a levy on graingrowers, which is determined by the industry's peak bodies Grains Producers Australia (GPA) and Graingrowers Ltd (GGL).  The Department of Agriculture is the relevant government department.

References

External links 
 

1990 establishments in Australia
Funding bodies of Australia
Grain industry of Australia
Research and development in Australia